The Wandering Jew is a 1933 British fantasy drama film produced for the Gaumont-Twickenham Film Studios and directed by Maurice Elvey. It recounts the tale of a Jew (played by Conrad Veidt) who is forced to wander the Earth for centuries because he rebuffed Jesus while he was carrying his cross. The other cast members included Peggy Ashcroft, Francis L. Sullivan, and Felix Aylmer. This film is a remake of the 1923 silent film of the same name, based on a play of the same name by E. Temple Thurston.

Plot
The plot follows the eponymous character's epic journey. He is finally burnt at the stake by the Spanish Inquisition. As he burns, he is forgiven by God and finally allowed to die. The story is a retelling of the myth of the Wandering Jew, dating back to the 13th century. The story bears a resemblance to the legend of the Flying Dutchman.

Cast 

 Conrad Veidt as Mathathias
 Marie Ney as Judith
 Basil Gil as Pontius Pilate
 Cicely Oates as Rachel
 Anne Grey as Joan de Baudricourt
 Dennis Hoey as Lord de Baudricourt
 Bertram Wallis as Prince Bohemund of Tarentum
 Hector Abbas as Isaachar the Miser
 Kenji Takase as Phirous
 Jack Livesey as Godfrey, Duke of Normandy
 Joan Maude as Gianella
 John Stuart as Pietro Morelli
 Arnold Lucy as Andrea Michelloti
 Peggy Ashcroft as Ollala Quintana
 Francis L. Sullivan as Archbishop Juan de Texada
 Abraham Sofaer as Zapportas
 Felix Aylmer as Ferera
 Ivor Barnard as Castro

Portrayal of Jews
Unlike the Nazis' 1940 antisemitic propaganda film, this film portrayed Jews as the victims of unjustified persecution throughout history, such as during the Spanish Inquisition. The version made under the Third Reich, by contrast, was intended to be virulently antisemitic.

References

External links
 The Wandering Jew at The Internet Movie Database

1934 films
Films originally rejected by the British Board of Film Classification
British black-and-white films
Films about race and ethnicity
British fantasy drama films
1930s fantasy drama films
Films about Jews and Judaism
Wandering Jew
1933 drama films
1933 films
1934 drama films
1930s English-language films
1930s British films